Gruznov is a Russian masculine surname, its feminine counterpart is Gruznova. It may refer to
 Maksim Gruznov (b. 1974) is a retired Estonian football striker.

Russian-language surnames